Drones is the third album by the American ambient musician Robert Rich. Like most of Rich's early work, this album consists of slow, textural drone music. The first track (“Seascape”) features ocean waves recorded at Ensenada, Mexico. In 1994 this album was re-released with Rich's previous album Trances in a two-disc set titled Trances/Drones.

Track listing
"Seascape" – 29:59
"Wheel of Earth" – 27:58

See also
Robert Rich
Ambient music

References

1983 albums
Robert Rich (musician) albums